Guido Carlesi (Vicarello di Collesalvetti, 7 November 1936) was an Italian professional road bicycle racer. Carlesi won two stages in the Tour de France and seven stages in the Giro d'Italia. In 1961, he finished 2nd in the general classification of the 1961 Tour de France.

Major results

1956
Tour des Alpes Apuanes
1958
Cotignola
Giro d'Italia:
Winner stage 13
1959
Giro d'Italia:
8th place overall classification
1960
Giro della Provincia di Reggio Calabria
Modena
Trofeo Longines (with Silvano Ciampi, Emile Daems, Rolf Graf, and Alfredo Sabbadin)
Giro d'Italia:
6th place overall classification
1961
Baasrode
Bort-les-Orgues
GP Saint-Raphael
Tour de France:
Winner stages 11 and 15
2nd place overall classification
Giro d'Italia:
5th place overall classification
1962
Firenze
Giro di Toscana
Jeumont
Sassari - Cagliari
Giro d'Italia:
Winner stages 13 and 21
9th place overall classification
1963
Genève
GP Cemab
Giro d'Italia:
Winner stages 4 and 20
8th place overall classification
1965
Giro d'Italia:
Winner stages 2 and 11

External links 

Official Tour de France results for Guido Carlesi

Italian male cyclists
1936 births
Living people
Italian Tour de France stage winners
Italian Giro d'Italia stage winners
Italian Vuelta a España stage winners
Sportspeople from the Province of Livorno
Tour de Suisse stage winners
Cyclists from Tuscany